The members of the 33rd General Assembly of Newfoundland were elected in the Newfoundland general election held in November 1962. The general assembly sat from March 20, 1963 to August 17, 1966.

The Liberal Party led by Joey Smallwood formed the government.

George W. Clarke served as speaker.

There were four sessions of the 33rd General Assembly:

Campbell Leonard Macpherson served as lieutenant governor of Newfoundland until 1963. Fabian O'Dea succeeded Macpherson as lieutenant-governor.

Members of the Assembly 
The following members were elected to the assembly in 1962:

Notes:

By-elections 
By-elections were held to replace members for various reasons:

Notes:

References 

Terms of the General Assembly of Newfoundland and Labrador